Pelochrista ornata is a species of moth of the family Tortricidae. It is found in China (Shanghai, Jiangsu) and Russia.

The larvae feed on Artemisia gmelinii.

References

Moths described in 1967
Eucosmini